Andrey Kolotvin (born 21 January 1972) is a Kazakhstani alpine skier. He competed in two events at the 1994 Winter Olympics.

References

External links
 

1972 births
Living people
Kazakhstani male alpine skiers
Olympic alpine skiers of Kazakhstan
Alpine skiers at the 1994 Winter Olympics
Place of birth missing (living people)